Ngāti Rakaipaaka is a Māori hapu (subtribe), from the Nūhaka area of northern Hawke's Bay on New Zealand's North Island. It is a subtribe of Ngāti Kahungunu.

Marae and wharenui

Northern Hawke's Bay

Ngāti Rakaipaaka has six marae (meeting grounds) and wharenui (meeting houses) in the Nūhaka area of northern Hawke's Bay:

 Kahungunu (Te Tāhinga) marae and Kahungunu wharenui on Ihaka Street
 Tamakahu marae and Tamakahu wharenui on State Highway 2
 Tāne-nui-a-Rangi marae and Tāne-nui-a-Rangi wharenui on State Highway 2
 Te Kotahitanga marae and Unity Hall wharenui on Epanaia Street
 Te Manutai marae and Te Manutai wharenui on State Highway 2
 Te Poho o Te Rehu (Te Rehu) marae and Te Poho o Te Rehu wharenui on Pomana Pā Road

Wairarapa
Ngāti Rakaipaaka is associated with one marae (meeting ground) and wharenui (meeting house) in the Martinborough area of Wairarapa:

 Kohunui marae and Te Tihi o Tuhirangi wharenui on Pirinoa Road

References